Gilbert Stroud Merritt Jr. (January 17, 1936 – January 17, 2022) was an American lawyer and jurist. He served as a United States circuit judge of the United States Court of Appeals for the Sixth Circuit from 1977 to 2022.

Early life 
Merritt was born on January 17, 1936, in Nashville, Tennessee. He attended public elementary school in Nashville and the Castle Heights Military Academy in Lebanon, Tennessee. Merritt attended Yale University, receiving a Bachelor of Arts in 1957 and a Bachelor of Laws from Vanderbilt University Law School in 1960. As a law student, Merritt was a member of the Order of the Coif and served as managing editor of Vanderbilt Law Review. He served as assistant dean and instructor at Vanderbilt University Law School from 1960 to 1961, and he earned a Master of Laws from Harvard Law School in 1962.

Legal career 
Merritt was in private practice in Nashville from 1962 to 1963 with the law firm of Boult, Hunt, Cummins and Connors. He served as an associate metropolitan attorney for the City of Nashville from 1963 to 1966, and as the United States Attorney for the Middle District of Tennessee from 1966 to 1969. From 1969 to 1970 Merritt was an associate professor of law at Vanderbilt University Law School. He returned to private practice in Nashville as a partner in the firm Gullett, Steele, Sanford, Robinson and Merritt from 1970 to 1970, specializing on federal civil and criminal litigation. Merritt served as a lecturer at Vanderbilt University Law School from 1973 to 1975 and as executive secretary of the Tennessee Code Commission in 1977.

Federal judicial service
President Jimmy Carter nominated him to the United States Court of Appeals for the Sixth Circuit on August 25, 1977, for the seat vacated by Judge William Ernest Miller. Merritt was confirmed by the United States Senate on October 29, 1977, and received commission on October 31, 1977. Merritt served as Chief Judge of the court from 1989 to 1996. He assumed senior status on January 17, 2001.

Supreme Court consideration
When Supreme Court Associate Justice Byron White retired in 1993, Merritt was considered a potential nominee, along with Secretary of the Interior Bruce Babbitt and Stephen Breyer of the First Circuit, who was eventually nominated by President Bill Clinton and subsequently joined the Court. Thomas L. Friedman, writing for The New York Times at the time, wrote that Merritt "is considered a moderate who would generate some Republican support" but noted that reports of his consideration "drew the ire" of the Simon Wiesenthal Center, which "criticized Judge Merritt for ordering an inquiry into the Justice Department's handling of the extradition of John Demjanjuk, who was convicted of Nazi war crimes by an Israeli court."

Later life and death
Merritt resided in Nashville and served as an adjunct professor at Vanderbilt University Law School. He died on January 17, 2022, his 86th birthday.

See also
Bill Clinton Supreme Court candidates
List of United States federal judges by longevity of service

References

External links 
 
 Profile from the American Inns of Court
  from the United States Court of Appeals for the Sixth Circuit
 

|-

|-

1936 births
2022 deaths
20th-century American judges
20th-century American lawyers
21st-century American judges
Harvard Law School alumni
Judges of the United States Court of Appeals for the Sixth Circuit
People from Nashville, Tennessee
United States Attorneys for the Middle District of Tennessee
United States court of appeals judges appointed by Jimmy Carter
Vanderbilt University Law School alumni
Yale University alumni
Vanderbilt University faculty